Orion (stylized in all caps) is the second studio album by American rock band X Ambassadors. It was released on June 14, 2019, by record labels KIDinaKORNER and Interscope Records. The album follows X Ambassadors' first studio album, VHS (2015), and is the first album to feature the band as a trio since Noah Fledshuh took a personal break from X Ambassadors in 2016. Three singles have been released from Orion: "Boom", "Hey Child", and "Hold You Down". The album features production from musicians such as Ricky Reed and Malay.

Background
X Ambassadors released their debut album, VHS, on June 30, 2015. The band went on tour to support the album, where they wrote several songs that became singles. On January 26, 2018, the song "Joyful" was released. Later that day, an album of the same name was announced. The album was originally slated for an April 2018 release. On February 2, 2018, a second single titled "Don't Stay" was released.

On April 19, 2019, roughly a year after the planned release date, X Ambassadors announced that they had cancelled the album. Singer Sam Harris stated in an interview with Billboard that the album was cancelled because "it didn't feel like it fully represented where [they] were at."

Promotion and tour
On January 24, 2019, the trio released the lead single from Orion titled "Boom". On April 19, 2019, X Ambassadors released another single, titled "Hey Child". A tour supporting Orion was announced on May 13, 2019, with 27 dates around the USA. 5 days later, additional dates were added.

The track listing was released through X Ambassadors' social media accounts on May 28, 2019. The next day, the band announced that the song "Happy Home" would be on the Target exclusive version.

Track listing

Notes
 All track titles are stylized in all caps.

Personnel 
Adapted credits from the liner notes of Orion.

X Ambassadors 
 Sam Harris – lead and backing vocals, guitars, bass guitar
 Casey Harris – piano, backing vocals, keyboards, synthesizers
 Adam Levin – drums, percussion

Additional musicians 
 K.Flay – additional vocals (on "Confidence")
 Jayson DeZuzio – additional vocals (on "Quicksand" and "Shadows")
 Ricky Reed – guitars, bass (on "Boom")
 Shaina Evoniuk – viola (on "History")
 Lewis Patzner – cello (on "History")

Production 
 Andrew Wells – engineering
 Ethan Shumaker – engineering
 Manny Marroquin – mixing
 Chris Galland – mixing
 Joe LaPorta – mastering

Artwork 
 Lauren Kallen – photography
 Dina Hovsepian – CD design
 Christopher Hill – lighting

Charts

References

2019 albums
X Ambassadors albums
Kidinakorner albums
Interscope Records albums
Albums produced by Malay (record producer)